Raoul Ngadrira (born 30 June 1989 in Kinshasa) is a Zaire-born Belgian footballer who plays as a forward for SK Pepingen-Halle.

References

External links

1989 births
Living people
Belgian footballers
Association football forwards
K.V. Mechelen players
K. Rupel Boom F.C. players
FC Lokomotiv 1929 Sofia players
Belgian Pro League players
First Professional Football League (Bulgaria) players
Expatriate footballers in Bulgaria
Democratic Republic of the Congo emigrants to Belgium
Footballers from Kinshasa